Ember to Inferno is the debut studio album by American heavy metal band Trivium. It was released on October 14, 2003, through Lifeforce Records and was produced by Jason Suecof and the band themselves.

Background
Trivium formed in 1999 with the band's first lineup consisting of guitarist Jarred Bonaparte, vocalist/bassist Brad Lewter, and drummer Travis Smith. Matt Heafy would join the band in 2000 as lead guitarist but would also take over lead vocal duties after Lewter's departure. The band would experience more lineup changes before recording its first demo, Ruber ("The Red Demo"), in 2001 with the lineup of Heafy on vocals and guitar, Brent Young on bass and backing vocals, and Smith on drums. George Moore would temporarily join the band as a second guitarist. In 2002, the band started to record its second demo, Caeruleus ("The Blue Demo"). Released in early 2003, the demo would find its way to German record label Lifeforce Records who would sign Trivium. The band would then enter the studio to record its debut studio album with producer Jason Suecof.

Overview
This album is the final release by the band with former bassist Brent Young. Frontman Matt Heafy was 17 years old when the album was written and recorded.

Corey Beaulieu toured in support of the album, but did not play on the album according to the re-release booklet. Beaulieu would not join the band until after recording of Ember to Inferno had concluded.

The 2004 reissue of the album includes early versions of "The Deceived" and "Blinding Tears Will Break the Skies". Both songs were re-recorded for Ascendancy, with the latter appearing only on the 2006 special edition. "Demon" is taken from the Trivium EP.

"Inception: The Bleeding Skies" is "A View of Burning Empires" played in reverse.

On December 2, 2014, it was announced by Matt Heafy on Twitter that Ember to Inferno would be re-released again with new artwork along with the band's early demo EPs. The re-release was officially revealed on October 14, 2016, via Trivium's Facebook page. It was released on December 2, 2016, two years after the initial announcement by Heafy. The re-release is dubbed Ab Initio, Latin for "From the Beginning".

"Pillars of Serpents" was re-recorded by Trivium for their 2017 album The Sin and the Sentence. Titled "Pillars of Serpents '17", it was included as a bonus track exclusively on the Japanese edition of the album. The re-recording was widely released to services such as YouTube, Spotify and iTunes on March 22, 2019 under the title of "Pillars of Serpents (2019)".

Musical style
Ember to Inferno has been generally described as metalcore, melodic death metal, thrash metal, alternative metal, power metal, "fantasy metal" and progressive metal.

Track listing

Notes
 Tracks 1 to 3 are from Ruber (The Red Demo).
 Tracks 4 to 10 are from Caeruleus (The Blue Demo).
 Tracks 11 to 13 are from Flavus (The Yellow Demo).

Personnel
Trivium
 Matt Heafy – lead vocals, guitars
 Brent Young – bass, backing vocals
 Travis Smith – drums, percussion
 Corey Beaulieu – lead guitar on Flavus (The Yellow Demo)

Additional musicians
 Jason Suecof – keyboards on "Inception: The Bleeding Skies" and "A View of Burning Empires", lead guitar on "Ember to Inferno" and "To Burn the Eye", choir vocals on "When All Light Dies"
 Alex Vieira – lead guitar on "When All Light Dies"
 George Moore – acoustic guitar on "A View of Burning Empires"
 Icky – acoustic guitar

Production
 Jason Suecof – producer, mixing, engineer
 Matt Heafy – producer
 Travis Smith – producer
 Brent Young – producer
 Tom Morris – mastering
 Christophe Szpajdel – logo (2016 re-issue)

Charts

References

2003 debut albums
Trivium (band) albums
Lifeforce Records albums
Albums produced by Jason Suecof